Joel Natalino Santana (born 25 December 1948) is a Brazilian football coach and former player. The last team he coached was Vasco da Gama, in 2014.

Biography

Born in Rio de Janeiro, Santana played his entire career as a central defender in his native Brazil in the 1970s. He became best known as a player at Vasco da Gama, but failed to earn a cap with the national team. In 1980, he retired as a player and moved on to club management with Al Wasl in the United Arab Emirates. While much of his management career has been with Brazilian clubs, Santana has also coached clubs in Saudi Arabia and Vegalta Sendai in Japan's J-League.

Santana is one of the few head coaches to win Brazil's Campeonato Carioca with each of the four big clubs (Botafogo, Flamengo, Fluminense, and Vasco da Gama). His playing style has been characterized as defensive, with the main objective of preventing the opposition from scoring.

In 2004, Santana successfully kept Vasco da Gama from relegation to the second division of Campeonato Brasileiro in his fourth stint as club's head coach. A year later, he was hired by Flamengo to also save them from relegation, which he did successfully. Having established a reputation as an "escape artist" capable of rescuing teams from relegation, he returned to Flamengo in 2007 with the same goal. He not only prevented relegation, but lead the Rio state club to a surprising third place finish to qualify for the 2008 Copa Libertadores.

In April 2008, Santana replaced his countryman, Carlos Alberto Parreira, as the coach of the South Africa national football team following a recommendation from Parreira himself who left the job due to personal reasons. In October 2009 Santana was dismissed from the position due to the poor results achieved by the team; most notably a streak of eight defeats in his last nine games as coach of the Bafana Bafana.

Joel Santana returned for his fifth spell as Flamengo's head coach on 3 February 2012. On 23 July 2012, Santana, after two consecutives loses, against Corinthians and Cruzeiro, was fired from Flamengo.

On 8 April 2013, after Jorginho's dismissal, Santana was hired for Bahia. He worked for fourth time at the Tricolor from Salvador.

Acting issues

In 2012, after a video featuring a post-match interview given by Santana during the 2009 FIFA Confederations Cup went viral as a result of his poor English language skills, he acted in a commercial for Pepsi, saying code-switching phrases such as "Ele quer saber se your dog has a phone" ("He wants to know if your dog has a phone number" - a tongue-in-cheek Brazilian Portuguese slang expression used when picking up women) and "Me dá uma Pepsi. Pode to be?" ("Can you give me a Pepsi? Can it be?" [sic]).

In 2013, he became the star of another commercial: an ad series for Head & Shoulders, again making light of his poor English. Happy with this and the former success, Santana told Brazilian sports channel SporTV about his experience in South Africa: "[Speaking English publicly] was indeed risky. The English-speaking press, very nobly, said: 'We don't care whether you are saying it right or wrong, mate, your feelings are actually what we want to know about.' And I think, in football, one needs to have feelings, otherwise, if one just philosophizes, one will never go further. Because of this, at that time, I risked myself. It turned out to be a plus, because I figured out a way to be a good pitchman."

Managerial statistics

Honors

Playing honors
América de Natal
Campeonato Potiguar: 1974, 1977, 1979, 1980

Vasco da Gama
Campeonato Brasileiro First Division: 1974
Campeonato Carioca: 1970

Managerial honors

Al Wasl FC
UAE Pro League: 1982, 1983, 1985

Al Nassr
Saudi Pro League: 1989

Bahia
Campeonato Baiano: 1994, 1999

Botafogo
Campeonato Carioca: 1997, 2010

Flamengo
Campeonato Carioca: 1996, 2008

Fluminense
Campeonato Carioca: 1995

South Africa
2009 FIFA Confederations Cup (4th place)

Vasco da Gama
Copa Mercosur: 2000
Campeonato Brasileiro First Division: 2000
Campeonato Carioca: 1992, 1993

Vitória
Campeonato Baiano: 2003
Supercampeonato Baiano: 2002

References

External links

1948 births
Living people
Footballers from Rio de Janeiro (city)
Brazilian footballers
Association football defenders
CR Vasco da Gama players
Olaria Atlético Clube players
América Futebol Clube (RN) players
Campeonato Brasileiro Série A players
Brazilian football managers
Al-Wasl F.C. managers
CR Vasco da Gama managers
Al Hilal SFC managers
America Football Club (RJ) managers
Al Nassr FC managers
Esporte Clube Bahia managers
Fluminense FC managers
CR Flamengo managers
Sport Club Corinthians Paulista managers
Botafogo de Futebol e Regatas managers
Coritiba Foot Ball Club managers
Esporte Clube Vitória managers
Guarani FC managers
Sport Club Internacional managers
Brasiliense Futebol Clube managers
Vegalta Sendai managers
South Africa national soccer team managers
Cruzeiro Esporte Clube managers
Boavista Sport Club managers
UAE Pro League managers
Campeonato Brasileiro Série A managers
Saudi Professional League managers
Campeonato Brasileiro Série B managers
Campeonato Brasileiro Série C managers
Campeonato Brasileiro Série D managers
J2 League managers
2009 FIFA Confederations Cup managers
Brazilian expatriate football managers
Brazilian expatriate sportspeople in the United Arab Emirates
Brazilian expatriate sportspeople in Saudi Arabia
Brazilian expatriate sportspeople in Japan
Brazilian expatriate sportspeople in South Africa
Brazilian expatriate sportspeople in the United States
Expatriate football managers in the United Arab Emirates
Expatriate football managers in Saudi Arabia
Expatriate football managers in Japan
Expatriate soccer managers in South Africa
Expatriate soccer managers in the United States